Lux in Tenebris, in Latin, meaning "Light in Darkness," is a short one-act farce, written in prose, by the German dramatist Bertolt Brecht. It is thought that he wrote it in 1919, under the influence of "that great Munich clown Karl Valentin".

The Latin phrase belongs to the Latin translation of the Gospel of John: "et lux in tenebris lucet et tenebrae eam non comprehenderunt", meaning "The Light shines in the darkness, and the darkness did not comprehend it".
(Fifth verse of Chapter I)

Sources
 Willett, John and Ralph Manheim. 1994. Introduction and Editorial Notes. Collected Plays: Two by Bertolt Brecht. Bertolt Brecht: Plays, Poetry, Prose Ser. London: Methuen. .

Notes

Plays by Bertolt Brecht
1919 plays